Circus International is a Canadian documentary television miniseries which aired on CBC Television in 1981.

Premise
Episodes followed circus entertainers in situations such as rehearsals. Al Waxman hosted this series. Circus troupes from Moscow and China (Wu Hang) were included in the series coverage.

Scheduling
This hour-long series was broadcast on Fridays at 8:00 p.m. (North American Eastern time) from 9 October to 13 November 1981.

References

External links
 

CBC Television original programming
1981 Canadian television series debuts
1981 Canadian television series endings
1980s Canadian documentary television series
Circus television shows